Oak Hollow Mall was a regional shopping mall which had over 80 working stores. At the time of its closing in 2017, occupancy was down to 11 stores. Most of the former mall building is owned by High Point University. Oak Hollow Mall was located in High Point, North Carolina, United States at the intersection of Eastchester Drive and East Hartley Drive.

History 
Oak Hollow Mall opened on August 9, 1995. When Oak Hollow Mall opened, it effectively led to the demise of Westchester Mall, which had opened in 1970 on High Point's west side off Westchester Drive just south of Phillips Avenue. After its closure, Westchester Mall was converted into Providence Place which includes First Wesleyan Church and several businesses.

Oak Hollow Mall saw a decline in the 2000s as many of its interior stores began shuttering, as did its anchors. The mall lost much of its traffic to retail centers in Greensboro and Winston-Salem in addition to facing challenges from the economic downturn. The Dillard's anchor closed one of its two levels and turned the remaining open area into an outlet for the chain. Another anchor, JCPenney, closed on June 1, 2011, as it was unable to meet the company's new profitability threshold. Steve & Barry's, which was originally Goody's Family Clothing, went out of business and was replaced by a Sears call center.

On February 24, 2011, CBL & Associates announced the sale of Oak Hollow Mall to High Point University for $9 million, although CBL continued to manage the mall. The university stated that the mall was to remain open as a retail complex for the time being.

On December 27, 2011, Sears Holdings Corporation announced that Sears in Oak Hollow Mall would close sometime in 2012. Liquidation sales began in February 2012, with the final closure occurring in the last weekend of April.

In January 2017, High Point University stated that it would be shutting down the mall, which at the time had 11 remaining stores, on March 10, 2017. 1924 Holdings, the limited liability company that operated the mall for the university, issued a statement that the closure of the Sears call center scheduled for the end of February rendered continued operation of the mall "unsustainable". After the closing, a community center would continue to operate in the former JCPenney space, as would the Dillard's Clearance Center, since the last remaining anchor still owned its space outright. The outer parcels, such as Target and Barnes & Noble, would also continue operation.

Major stores 
 Dillard's Clearance Center - 

Outparcels
 Target, opened in 1997

Former stores 
 Barnes & Noble - (closed January 2020)
 Belk -  (closed April 2014) Relocated to Palladium shopping center
 Circuit City -  (closed November 2008) - Now High Point University Department of Physicians Assistant Studies
 Golden Corral -  (closed April 2012) building later demolished
 Goody's / Steve & Barry's University Sportswear -  (Goody's closed August 2005| Steve & Barry's closed December 2008) - later Sears Operations Center (Call Center) departed early 2017.
 JCPenney -  (closed July 2011)
 Sears -  (closed April 2012)
 Pier 1 Imports -  (closed June 2015)
 Regal Cinemas -  (closed October 2012)

See also 
 List of shopping malls in the United States

References

External links 
 Oak Hollow Mall website

Shopping malls in North Carolina
Buildings and structures in High Point, North Carolina
Shopping malls established in 1995
CBL Properties
Buildings and structures in Guilford County, North Carolina
Tourist attractions in Guilford County, North Carolina
Defunct shopping malls in the United States